Giulio Sauli (died 1570) was a Roman Catholic prelate who served as Bishop of Brugnato (1565–1570).

Biography
On 26 October 1565, Giulio Sauli was appointed during the papacy of Pope Pius IV as Bishop of Brugnato.
On 21 April 1566, he was consecrated bishop by Benedetto Lomellini, Cardinal-Deacon of Santa Sabina, with Pierdonato Cesi (seniore), Administrator of Narni, and Gerolamo Melchiori, Bishop of Macerata, serving as co-consecrators. 
He served as Bishop of Brugnato until his death in 1570.

References

External links and additional sources
 (for Chronology of Bishops) 
 (for Chronology of Bishops) 

16th-century Italian Roman Catholic bishops
Bishops appointed by Pope Pius IV
1570 deaths